Wintersun is the 2004 debut studio album by heavy metal band Wintersun, then the solo project of Jari Mäenpää. The Japanese edition of the album was released with the original three demo tracks used to obtain a contract with Nuclear Blast.

History
Wintersun was a project eight years in the making. Jari Mäenpää began writing the music for Wintersun in late 1995, before joining folk metal band Ensiferum in 1996 as lead singer and guitarist.  In 1997, Mäenpää served in the Finnish military as part of his national defense duty, during which he contracted tuberculosis.  The diagnosis was late, and Mäenpää required surgery to remove part of his lung, hospitalizing him for months.  The song "Beautiful Death" would later be inspired by this event.

In 2003, Mäenpää hired Kai Hahto as a session drummer and, after sending newly recorded demos to Nuclear Blast, was offered a record deal. After returning from Ensiferum's Iron recording sessions, Mäenpää began arranging the compositions of the future Wintersun tracks. Despite intending to keep Wintersun as a side project, a scheduling conflict between booked studio time for Wintersun and a tour promoting Iron forced Mäenpää to request time off from the band, which resulted in him being forced to leave Ensiferum.

Production
Several recording studios were used in the making of the album.  Kai Hahto's drums were recorded at Tico Tico Studios in January 2004.  Vocals and the majority of the guitars and synthesizers were recorded at Sundi Coop Studios in April.  Additional synth and guitar solos were recorded at Mäenpää's home on his 16-track.

Mäenpää, used to multi-track recording his music for years, was comfortable performing vocals, guitars, bass, and keyboards on the record.

The lyrics are considered to be an integral part of the album's thematic structure, although they can be interpreted on varying levels.

Nino Laurenne, guitarist for Thunderstone, mixed the album at Sonic Pump Studios.  Mastering was done by Mika Jussila at Finnvox Studios. The album was released on September 13, 2004.

Artwork
The cover artwork was commissioned from Kristian Wåhlin (who works under the name Necrolord).  Mäenpää had already worked with Wåhlin on the artwork for the Ensiferum albums, but Mäenpää was inspired by the work that delved into colder, majestic landscapes, including Emperor's In the Nightside Eclipse and Dissection's Storm of the Light's Bane.  In addition to Mäenpää's idea for the cover, Wåhlin was given lyrics to read and samples of music to listen to.

Mäenpää compared the artwork to the song "Death and the Healing":  "The man fallen into the snow could represent 'death' [and] 'despair,' and the light between the trees could represent 'home' [or] "birth/healing.'"

"Beyond the Dark Sun" music video

Concept

The video begins with two shots of steel doors opening, revealing Mäenpää thrashing with his guitar in sharp silhouette against a single source of light, fog simulating the cold swirling around him. During the introduction portion of the song, the video cuts quickly between the contemporary band line-up, each member performing solely against a black backdrop: Mäenpää on guitar, Hahto performing on drums, Jukka Koskinen on five-string bass, and Oliver Fokin on rhythm guitar.

The first visual effect is introduced with Mäenpää superimposed over the moon. The moon effect is revisited several times throughout the video, usually with varying backdrops that simulate galaxies, stars, and asteroids. When Mäenpää begins singing in clean voice, the motif of ice is introduced.  A plane of white-blue tendrils of frost and frozen smoke separates the singer from the viewer; slight overexposure and pale makeup on Mäenpää's face increases the overall effect of coldness.

The shots cut sharply to Mäenpää quickly stepping into the camera's focal plane, singing with harsh vocals into an upright microphone.  Meanwhile, the video continues to cross-cut between the other band members. The music video eventually cuts between each of these established motifs for the remainder of the song, expanding on a few ideas, including the thawing of the frost; several shots of Fokin and Mäenpää playing together, each lit by their own spotlight; shots of Hahto's double mallets hitting the bass drum; and a single, dark shot of the entire band playing together. The final few shots of the video show Mäenpää being blinded by a brilliant beam of light.

Production
The music video for "Beyond the Dark Sun" was shot over a period of two days, on July 3 and 4, 2004.  It was produced and directed by Maurice Swinkels for LowLifeMedia. The official video can be viewed here.

The cameo lighting technique is used almost exclusively to separate the band members from the black background or frosted foregrounds, and, paired with overexposure, is effective at making Mäenpää appear deep within an ice encasing.  Two spotlights are used at times to separate band members appearing together.

Reception 

Eduardo Rivadavia of Allmusic calls Wintersun a blend of "the hyper-fast precision of Yngwie Malmsteen-like guitar playing (witness the speedy "Beyond the Dark Sun") with the melodic sensibilities of post-Helloween power metal (see the more diverse "Winter Madness") and a homegrown passion for folk-styled songwriting descended straight from trailblazing compatriots Amorphis", describing their musicianship as "superb".  He calls the guitar playing on "Death and the Healing" "jaw-dropping" and finds "Beautiful Death" "stunning (if quite morbid)".  His overall impression was one of surprise, making note of the fact that he based his initial impression on the artwork, which "elicit[ed] thoughts of simplistic black metal infused with pagan or anti-Christian messages."  Despite these "twists and turns", Rivadavia found the album formulaic at times and rated it 3.5/5.

Mike Stagno, a staff member for Sputnikmusic, rated the album 4.5/5 and calls the band "stronger" than Ensiferum; he also describes their sound as "combining the likes of neoclassical metal, folk metal, power metal, black metal, and melodic death metal". Stagno emphasizes the connection between the music and the album's cover artwork, both of which are depicted as "bleak and cold" while retaining a "mystical attractiveness."  Stagno's only problem lay with Mäenpää's clean vocals, which were "passive sounding" and weren't "quite as refined" as harsh vocals.

Track listing

Notes
The five sections within "Starchild" are not listed on the back of the album, but the lyrics within the liner notes are segmented with the titles of each "part".
There is also an early version of "Sadness and Hate" recorded back in 1996 as part of a demo from Jari Mäenpää's former band, Immemorial.

Personnel 
Wintersun
 Jari Mäenpää – vocals, guitar, bass, keyboards, producer
 Kai Hahto – drums
 Teemu Mäntysaari − guitar (only on Live & Raw CD)
 Jukka Koskinen − bass (only on Live & Raw CD)

Production
 Ahti Kortelainen – drum engineering
 Tuomo Valtonen – engineer
 Nino Laurenne – mixing
 Mika Jussila – mastering
 Kristian Wåhlin – cover art
 Helgorth – booklet design
 Mario Koivumäki – photography
 Tuomas Tahvanainen – Wintersun logo

Wintersun: Special Tour Edition

On September 29, 2006, Wintersun released Wintersun: Special Tour Edition, a live album. The tour edition is a Digipack that includes the original version of the album Wintersun and a live DVD from Wintersun's performance at Summer Breeze Open Air in 2005.

Track listing
Disc 1 (same as Wintersun)

Release history

References

Wintersun albums
2004 debut albums
Albums with cover art by Kristian Wåhlin
Nuclear Blast albums